The 2015–16 East Carolina Pirates men's basketball team represented East Carolina University during the 2015–16 NCAA Division I men's basketball season. The Pirates were led by sixth year head coach Jeff Lebo and played their home games at Williams Arena at Minges Coliseum as second year members of the American Athletic Conference. The Pirates finished the season with a record of 12–20, 4–14 in AAC play to finish in a tie for ninth place in conference. They lost to South Florida in the first round of the AAC tournament.

Previous season
The Pirates finished the 2014–15 season with a record of 14–19, 6–12 in AAC play to finish in a tie for seventh place in conference. They advanced to the quarterfinals of the AAC tournament where they lost to SMU.

Departures

Incoming Transfers

Incoming recruits

Roster

Schedule

|-
!colspan=9 style="background:#4F0076; color:#FFE600;"| Non-conference regular season

|-
!colspan=9 style="background:#4F0076; color:#FFE600;"| AAC regular season

|-
!colspan=9 style="background:#4F0076; color:#FFE600;"| American Athletic Conference tournament

References

East Carolina Pirates men's basketball seasons
East Carolina
2015 in sports in North Carolina
2016 in sports in North Carolina